Siripuch Gulnoi formerly Rattikan Gulnoi is a Thai weightlifter. She competed at the 2012 Summer Olympics in the women's 58 kg. She set personal bests in both the clean and jerk and the snatch, achieving 100 kg and 134 kg respectively. She originally finished fourth, but was promoted to third and won the bronze medal after Yuliya Kalina was disqualified.

In January 2020, a documentary on systemic doping in international weightlifting by the German broadcaster ARD featured a hidden camera interview with Gulnoi, where she admitted to having continuously doped since the age of 18, including ahead of the 2012 Summer Olympics. Bossaba Yodbangtoey, the head of the Thai Amateur Weightlifting Association, stated Gulnoi exaggerated the extent of doping practices in Thai weightlifting.

References

Siripuch Gulnoi
Living people
Siripuch Gulnoi
Weightlifters at the 2012 Summer Olympics
Weightlifters at the 2016 Summer Olympics
Weightlifters at the 2014 Asian Games
Asian Games medalists in weightlifting
1993 births
World Weightlifting Championships medalists
Siripuch Gulnoi
Siripuch Gulnoi
Medalists at the 2014 Asian Games
Siripuch Gulnoi
Southeast Asian Games medalists in weightlifting
Competitors at the 2011 Southeast Asian Games
Medalists at the 2012 Summer Olympics
Olympic medalists in weightlifting
Siripuch Gulnoi
Siripuch Gulnoi